Frederick Lilburn Hartman (May 21, 1917 – April 30, 1984) was an American football tackle who played for two seasons in the National Football League (NFL). He played college football for Schreiner College and Rice before being drafted by the Chicago Bears in the eighth round (61st overall) of the 1941 NFL Draft. He played for the Bears in 1947 and for the Philadelphia Eagles in 1948, winning an NFL championship with the Eagles in 1948.

1917 births
1984 deaths
American football tackles
Schreiner Mountaineers football players
Rice Owls football players
Chicago Bears players
Philadelphia Eagles players
Players of American football from Dallas